Dominion 6.16 was a professional wrestling pay-per-view (PPV) event promoted by New Japan Pro-Wrestling (NJPW). The event took place on June 16, 2012, in Osaka, Osaka, at the newly renamed Bodymaker Colosseum. The event featured ten matches, four of which were contested for championships. It was the fourth event under the Dominion name.

Storylines
Dominion 6.16 featured ten professional wrestling matches that involved different wrestlers from pre-existing scripted feuds and storylines. Wrestlers portrayed villains, heroes, or less distinguishable characters in the scripted events that built tension and culminated in a wrestling match or series of matches.

Event
The opening match saw participation from the DDT Pro-Wrestling trio of Daisuke Sasaki, Kenny Omega and Kota Ibushi facing  NJPW's Bushi, Kushida and Prince Devitt in a six-man tag team match. The third match was a decision match to determine the new IWGP Junior Heavyweight Tag Team Championship. Jyushin Thunder Liger and Tiger Mask defeated Taichi and Taka Michinoku to win the vacant title, when Liger revived his old Kishin Liger persona, after being unmasked by Taichi. The event saw Low Ki successfully defend the IWGP Junior Heavyweight Championship against 2012 Best of the Super Juniors winner Ryusuke Taguchi, while two attempts were unable to determine the winner between IWGP Tag Team Champions, Takashi Iizuka and Toru Yano, and challengers, Tencozy (Hiroyoshi Tenzan and Satoshi Kojima). As a result, four days later, the IWGP Tag Team Championship was declared vacant. In the main event, Hiroshi Tanahashi recaptured the IWGP Heavyweight Championship from Kazuchika Okada. With his sixth title win, Tanahashi tied the record for most reigns as the IWGP Heavyweight Champion.

Reception
Tokyo Sports later named the main event the 2012 Match of the Year.

Results

References

External links
The official New Japan Pro-Wrestling website

2012
2012 in professional wrestling
June 2012 events in Japan
Professional wrestling in Osaka
Events in Osaka